William Reeves (10 February 1825 – 4 April 1891) was a New Zealand 19th century journalist and politician. He was the father of the author and politician the Hon. William Pember Reeves.

Reeves was born in 1825 in Clapham, Surrey, England.

He contested the Selwyn electorate in 1871 against Edward Cephas John Stevens and had a majority of one vote. He was Resident Minister for the Middle (South) Island in the 3rd Fox Ministry in 1871–1872. The dominant topic for the 1875 election was the abolition of the Provinces. Reeves favoured the retention of the provincial system of government, whilst Cecil Fitzroy, 20 years his junior, was an abolitionist. Fitzroy narrowly won the election in the Selwyn electorate by 14 votes. On 21 October 1884, Reeves was appointed to the New Zealand Legislative Council. He served until his death on 4 April 1891.

He was a journalist and newspaper proprietor in Christchurch and Lyttelton, and was the principal proprietor of the Lyttelton Times, though he died virtually bankrupt (he had failed on the Stock Exchange in England before migrating to New Zealand).

Reeves underwent an operation at the end of March 1891. Later in the week, complications set in and he died the following day on 4 April 1891 at his homestead 'Risingholme'. He is buried at Barbadoes Street Cemetery and it was the largest Christchurch funeral since William Sefton Moorhouse had died 10 years earlier. Risingholme in the Christchurch suburb of Opawa was registered by the New Zealand Historic Places Trust (now Heritage New Zealand) as a Category II heritage building on 24 June 2005.

Reeves was survived by his wife and their eight children. His son, William Pember Reeves, who became a dominant politician in New Zealand, was married to Maud Pember Reeves. Amber Reeves was his granddaughter.

Notes

References

|-

1825 births
1891 deaths
New Zealand journalists
Members of the Cabinet of New Zealand
Members of the New Zealand House of Representatives
Members of the New Zealand Legislative Council
People from Christchurch
New Zealand MPs for Christchurch electorates
Independent MPs of New Zealand
English emigrants to New Zealand
Burials at Barbadoes Street Cemetery
Unsuccessful candidates in the 1875–1876 New Zealand general election
19th-century journalists
Male journalists
19th-century male writers
19th-century New Zealand politicians
Harper family
William